Europatat, or European Potato Trade Association, is a trade association of European national associations and companies involved in the trade of seed potatoes and ware potatoes. Europatat was established in 1952 and is located in Brussels.

History 
Europatat was established on 12 January 1952 under the name European Union for the Wholesale Trade in Potatoes in Paris. Its first members were Belgium, Denmark, France, Germany, Italy, The Netherlands and Switzerland.

In September 2014, Raquel Izquierdo de Santiago replaced Frédéric Rosseneu as Secretary general of Europata.

References

External links
 

Organizations established in 1952
Food industry trade groups
Potato organizations
Agricultural organisations based in Belgium
1952 establishments in Belgium